Cypress Avenue East Historic District is a national historic district in Ridgewood, Queens, New York.  It includes 247 contributing buildings built between 1900 and 1914.  They consist mainly of three story tenements with two apartments per floor.  They feature alternating facades of light and dark speckled brick.

The district boundaries were drawn to exclude commercial and frame construction buildings, and include the following addresses:
Linden Street
16-66 to 16-92
17-02 to 17-40
Cypress Avenue
654, 664
Gates Avenue
16-73 to 16-91
16-74 to 16-94
17-01 to 17-21
17-02 to 17-22
Palmetto Street
16-63 to 16-83
17-01 to 17-21
17-02 to 17-22
Woodbine Street
16-61 to 16-83
16-60/2? to 16-84
17-01 to 17-21
17-02 to 17-26
Seneca Avenue
652 to 668
784 to 790
802 to 816
Madison Street
17-01 to 17-25
17-10 to 17-28
Cornelia Street
17-19 to 17-33

The district was listed on the National Register of Historic Places in 1983.

References

Ridgewood, Queens
Historic districts on the National Register of Historic Places in Queens, New York
Historic districts in Queens, New York